Sweet tea is a style of iced tea.

"Sweet Tea" can also refer to the following:

 Sweet Tea Recording Studio, a studio in Mississippi
 Sweet Tea (album), a 2001 album by Buddy Guy named after the studio
Sweet Tea: Black Gay Men of the South—An Oral History, a 2008 ethnographic book by E. Patrick Johnson

See also
 Sweet Tee, an American rapper who recorded in the 1980s and 90s
 Matt Bloom, an American wrestler who has had the nickname "Sweet T"